Braven is a 2018 action thriller film directed by Lin Oeding and written by Mike Nilon and Thomas Pa'a Sibbett. The film stars Jason Momoa as Joe Braven, with Garret Dillahunt, Stephen Lang, Jill Wagner, and Brendan Fletcher. Principal photography began in December 2015 in Newfoundland, Canada. The film was released on February 2, 2018.

Plot
Logging company owner and family man Joe Braven lives with his wife Stephanie and their daughter Charlotte. Braven's father Linden, who suffers from brain trauma due to a head injury, gets into a bar room brawl after mistaking a woman for his wife, requiring Joe to come to his aid and resulting in Linden going to the hospital. At Stephanie's suggestion Joe and Linden decide to spend some time together at the family's secluded mountain cabin, unaware that Charlotte was hiding in the back of the vehicle so she could tag along.

While transporting logs by truck, Joe's co-worker Weston is asked by Hallett, who is a drug trafficker, to recruit other drivers into Hallett's criminal activities, but Weston refuses. During the exchange, Weston loses control of his truck, causing a crash that displaces all the logs and cocaine from the vehicle. After they resolve to go to Joe's mountain cabin to store the cocaine there, Weston and Hallett are picked up by a police patrol car. Hallett relays the news of the crash to his employer, drug lord Kassen, moments before Kassen kills Randall, who presumably worked with him in the past.

After Joe, Linden and Charlotte arrive at the cabin, Joe discovers the cocaine hidden in the shed, so he hides Charlotte in a storage closet before being surrounded by Kassen's mercenaries. When Weston tries to act as a go-between, Kassen kills him. Unable to call for help because of lack of cellular signals at the cabin, Joe, armed with a bow and arrow, and Linden with a gun, kills one of the mercenaries named Luisi during the ensuing standoff.

Needing higher ground to access a cellular network, Joe drives out of the house on a quad bike with the original cocaine bag, with  Charlotte hidden under a blanket. Joe drops Charlotte off and instructs her to climb to the mountain, where she calls her mother, who in turn calls the sheriff. While Joe is driving, another mercenary named Gentry attacks him and nearly gets the best of him before Joe straps Gentry's foot on the quad and drives it off a cliff, killing Gentry and almost killing Joe. Kassen finds the bag, but it is empty. Discovering where Joe sent Charlotte, Kassen sends one of the mercenaries, Ridley, to find her. Hallett enters the cabin and is stabbed twice with a skewer by Linden, killing him.

Just before Ridley catches up to Charlotte, a bow-wielding Stephanie arrives and shoots Ridley with an arrow. A hand-to-hand fight ensues, during which she stabs Ridley before fleeing, unable to finish him off. Meanwhile, Joe returns to the cabin, where he dispatches another mercenary named Clay and kills Essington soon after. Charlotte is picked up by the sheriff as Ridley continues to pursue Stephanie. Kassen takes Linden hostage and, after Joe pleads for his father's life, Kassen fatally stabs Linden. Kassen shoots the sheriff and escapes from the cabin, though never manages to kill him, though he does manage to retrieve the lost cocaine. Joe chases after him and runs into Stephanie and helps her kill Ridley, and after a violent knife fight Joe pushes Kassen off a cliff, killing him, before being reunited with Stephanie and Charlotte.

Cast

Production 
September 3, 2015, it was announced that Jason Momoa would star in the action thriller film Braven to be directed by Lin Oeding, based on the story by Mike Nilon and scripted by Thomas Pa'a Sibbett. Momoa would produce the film along with his partner Brian Mendoza through their Pride of Gypsies banner, along with Nilon and Molly Hassell. On December 14, 2015, Garret Dillahunt joined the film to play the villainous role.

Principal photography on the film began early-December 2015 in Newfoundland, Canada.

Reception
On Metacritic, the film has a weighted average score of 61 out of 100, based on 10 critics, indicating "generally favorable reviews".

References

External links 
 

2018 films
English-language Canadian films
Canadian action thriller films
American action thriller films
2018 action thriller films
Films shot in Newfoundland and Labrador
2018 directorial debut films
2010s English-language films
2010s American films
2010s Canadian films